Brennen Beyer (born November 25, 1992) is an American football outside linebacker who is currently a free agent. He played college football at Michigan.

High school
Beyer attended Plymouth High School, where he played football and was a first-team All-conference, All-league, All-Detroit West, and All-Metro Detroit selection as a junior and senior. He also was an Associated Press (AP) All-State honorable mention. As a senior, he recorded 65 tackles and 12 sacks.

College career
After graduating from high school, Beyer enrolled at the University of Michigan College of Literature, Science and the Arts to major in psychology.

As a freshman in 2011, Beyer appeared in 11 games. He recorded 11 tackles (five solo.). In 2012 as a sophomore, he appeared in 11 games (nine starts). He recorded 19 tackles (nine solo.), 0.5 sacks, and once forced fumble. He was named to the academic All-Big Ten for the season. As a junior in 2013, he appeared in 13 games (five starts at linebacker, seven at defensive end). He recorded 27 tackles, four tackles-for-loss, two sacks, one forced fumble, and an interception returned for a touchdown. For the season, he was named to the academic All-Big Ten team. He also received the schools Athletic Academic Achievement award. In 2014 as a senior, he appeared in 12 games (11 starts). He recorded 35 tackles, 7.5 tackles-for-loss and 5.5 sacks. He was again named to the Academic All-Big Ten team.

Career statistics

Professional career

After going undrafted in the 2015 NFL Draft, Beyer signed with the Baltimore Ravens on May 7, 2015. He was released during final cuts on September 5, 2015 and was signed to the practice squad the next day. On January 4, 2016, he signed a reserve/future contract the Ravens.

On September 3, 2016, Beyer was released by the Ravens and was signed to the practice squad the next day. On December 24, 2016, he was promoted to the Ravens' active roster. He made his professional debut during Week 17 against the Cincinnati Bengals, recording three tackles (two solo).

On September 2, 2017, Beyer was waived/injured by the Ravens and placed on injured reserve. He was released on September 6, 2017.

Career statistics

References

External links
 Michigan Wolverines bio

1992 births
Living people
American football defensive ends
American football linebackers
Michigan Wolverines football players
Baltimore Ravens players
Players of American football from New York (state)
People from Sayville, New York